Askim Næringspark Station, until 2008 named Næringsparken, was a railway station situated in the eastern outskirts of Askim, Norway. Situated , it consisted of a single side platform and served an hourly train of the Oslo Commuter Rail. The station opened on 29 May 1994. It was closed on 9 December 2012 due to low usage, with only 44 average daily boarding and disembarking passengers.

History
The former was closed on 1 February 1947. Sulerud wasclosed on 29 May 1994, the same day as Næringsparken opened. It changed its name from Næringsparken to Askim Næringspark in 2008. The station was served by an hourly service of the Oslo Commuter Rail along the Eastern Østfold Line.

With the platform too short for new NSB Class 72 trains, the Norwegian National Rail Administration was required to lengthen the platform or close the station by 2012. They estimated the costs at 13 million Norwegian kroner. Næringsparken had limited patronage, with only 44 average daily boarding and disembarking passengers in 2008. This compared for instance with 1,400 at Askim Station. The station was therefore closed down, along with Drømtorp, Langli, Langnes on the Eastern Line, on 9 December 2012. In addition to saving the investment costs, cutting four stations allowed faster travel time from the remaining stations. To a certain degree many of the people previously using Askim Næringspark as a park and ride station started using Slitu Station instead.

Facilities

The station was situated in the eastern outskirts of Askim,  from Askim Station. The surrounding area was mostly an industrial zone. With a radius of  there were 1,600 residents and 900 work places. The station had about 44 daily passengers.

References

Bibliography
 
 

Disused railway stations in Norway
Railway stations in Askim
Railway stations on the Østfold Line
Railway stations opened in 1994
Railway stations closed in 2012
1994 establishments in Norway
2012 disestablishments in Norway